Telethon 1992 is the 11th version of the solidarity campaign conducted in Chile, which took place on 27 and 28 November 1992. The theme of this version was "There is so much to do." The goal was reached with $ 2,512,056,801 (at that time, later the total was released as $ 2,874,230,697). The poster boy was Nicholas Sanchez.

Sponsors

Artists

National singers 
  Illapu
  
  La Ley (band)
  
  
  Diva
  Sindrome
  Eduardo Fuentes
  Sebastián
  Parkinson
  Mónica De Calixto
  Fernando Casas
  Giolito y su Combo
  Lorena
  Pachuco y la Cubanacán
  Valija Diplomática
  Miguel Piñera
  Zabaleta Brothers
  Sonora Palacios
  La nueva ola
  Zalo Reyes
  Germán Casas
  Fernando Ubiergo

Foreigners 
  Joan Manuel Serrat
   Yordano
  Xavier
  Hernaldo Zúñiga
  The Sacados
  Luz Casal
  Braulio
  Luisín Landáez
  Gionna Gionini
  Banana 5
  Las Primas
  Sergio Dalma
  Los Auténticos Decadentes
  Pablito Ruiz
   Natusha
  José Feliciano
   Amanda Miguel
  Bertín Osborne
  Ángela Carrasco
  Olé Olé

Comedians 
 Mc Phantom
 Los Manolos
 Luis Pescetti
 Gigi Martin
 Sandy
 D'Angelo
 "Pinto, Paredes y Angulo" (Eduardo Thompson, Guillermo Bruce y Gilberto Guzmán)

Child's section 
 Cachureos
 Arboliris
 Profesor Rossa
 El Club Disney
 Pipiripao
 Niñerías
 Mundo Mágico
 Sólo para menores

Adult's section 
 Las Guerreras
 Mónica Volgin
 Norma Benítez
 Erika de Sautiristro
 Marixa Balli
 Maripepa Nieto

Transmission 
 La Red
 UCV Televisión
 Televisión Nacional de Chile
 Megavisión
 RTU Red de Televisión Universidad de Chile
 Universidad Católica de Chile Televisión
 Telenorte
 Canal 8 UCV Televisión
 TV Cable Intercom

References

External links

1992 in Chile
Chilean telethons